Peach enation virus is a plant pathogenic virus of the family Comoviridae.

External links
ICTVdB - The Universal Virus Database: Peach enation virus
Family Groups - The Baltimore Method

Viral plant pathogens and diseases
Nepoviruses